Brexit: The Movie is a 2016 British film written and directed by Martin Durkin, advocating for the withdrawal of the United Kingdom from the European Union, commonly called Brexit (a portmanteau of British and exit). The film's production was funded through crowdfunding via Kickstarter.

It premiered in London on 11 May 2016, before being released the following day on YouTube and Vimeo.

Production
Brexit: The Movie was written and directed by Martin Durkin to advocate for the withdrawal of the United Kingdom from the European Union (Brexit) prior to the United Kingdom European Union membership referendum in June 2016. The film was crowdfunded through Kickstarter, with its £100,000 goal having been met with contributions from 1,500 donors by 26 February 2016.

According to the film's official website, by the end of production, a total of over £300,000 had been raised by over 1,800 contributors. One of the producers of the film David Shipley was convicted of fraud by false representation and received a jail sentence of three years and nine months in February 2020. The fraud occurred in 2014 when he was attempting to find funding for his corporate finance advisory firm Spitfire Capital. The firm provided £50,000 towards the production of the film.

The film featured many leading advocates of leaving the European Union, including: 

 5th Viscount Ridley, the former Chair of the collapsed bank, Northern Rock.
 Baron Hannan of Kingsclere, Former Member of the European Parliament.
 Baroness Fox of Buckley, Former Member of the European Parliament and co-publisher of Living Marxism.
 Baron Lawson of Blaby Former politician and journalist
 Baron Howard of Lympne Former politician
 Baroness of Lylehill & Rathlin Former politician
Baron Lilley of Offa. Former Politician
 James Delingpole Anti-Covid vaccination activist and contributor for Breibart News.
 Janet Daley Daily Telegraph Columnist
 Simon Heffer Daily Telegraph Columnist
 James Bartholomew Daily Telegraph Columnist and former candidate for the Brexit party.
 Mark Littlewood, Director for the Institute of Economic Affairs
 Eamonn Butler, Economist for the Adam Smith Insittute
 Kelvin Mackenzie, Former editor of the Sun

Synopsis 
The film argued it was in the interest for the United Kingdom to leave the European Union, due to lack of accountability of its institutions and that Britain should follow the Swiss economic model and strike new trade deals with the rest of the world.

Distribution
The film was made available for free online streaming on YouTube and Vimeo on 12 May 2016, the day after its release and premiere at the Odeon Leicester Square in London. The film's premiere was organised by Brexit campaign Leave.EU. It was also broken into a twenty six part series published as a YouTube playlist, embedded on the film's official website.

Reception
Brexit: The Movie received over 1.5 million views on YouTube by 23 June 2016 (the date of the referendum). The film received mixed reviews from critics. Paul Baldwin writing for The Daily Express, a pro-Brexit newspaper, called it a "powerful" exposure of the lack of accountability within the European Union. Nicholas Dunn-McAfee of the Public Relations and Communications Association commented that the film was "easily digestible" and "witty" but felt that it was a "little too late and a little too stretched".

Newsweek reviewer noted the film's attempt to market to conservative, anti-establishment audiences, calling it "a libertarian's wet dream of Randian proportions" but criticised alleged inconsistencies in the film. The Huffington Post reviewer felt that relied on ethnic stereotypes and omitted certain perspectives. However also praised the film's persuasiveness, but indicated that it could potentially drive voters to support the UK remaining within the EU. German newspaper Frankfurter Allgemeine Zeitung, criticised the lack of balance in the film, as it did not feature a single pro-European Union viewpoint.

The comedian John Oliver pointed out the inaccuracies of the claims made in the film including that sleeping pillows were subjected to 109 different types of regulations. He pointed that some of those regulations were not for sleeping pillows but for breakfast cereals or for air mattress foot-pumps.

See also
 The European Union: In or Out
 Brexit: The Uncivil War
Euromyth

References

External links

2016 films
2016 documentary films
British documentary films
2016 United Kingdom European Union membership referendum
Documentaries about politics
Films about Brexit
2010s English-language films
2010s British films